Wilson Augusto Pineda Cornelio (born on 25 September 1993) is a Guatemalan professional footballer who plays for Liga Nacional club Guastatoya and the Guatemalan national team.

He debuted internationally in a friendly match on 18 August 2018, where he scored his first goal for Guatemala in a 1–0 victory over Cuba national football team.

On 12 October 2019, Pineda scored his first goal in a major competition against Anguilla during the match of the CONCACAF Nations League in a 0–5 victory.

International goals
Scores and results list Guatemala's goal tally first.

Honours
Guastatoya
 Liga Nacional de Guatemala: Clausura 2018, Apertura 2018, Apertura 2020

References

External links
 

1993 births
Living people
Guatemalan footballers
Guatemala international footballers
Association football defenders
C.D. Guastatoya players
Comunicaciones F.C. players
Liga Nacional de Fútbol de Guatemala players